The marbled leaf-toed gecko (Afrogecko porphyreus) is a gecko found in southern and southwestern South Africa (including many offshore islands) and in Namibia. It is a flat, medium-sized gecko.

Description
It has a mottled, greyish body, a long tail and sometimes a pale stripe along its back. It is an adaptable little forager, hiding under debris, beneath bark, among rocks and even in city houses.

These geckos eat large numbers of small insects, so a population of them living on one's property serves as a natural form of pest-control. However, domestic cats - as introduced predators - will usually kill large numbers of these little lizards, often exterminating them from the immediate area. Their diet is an array of invertebrates, including feeder insects.

Distribution
This gecko occurs commonly in the southern parts of South Africa, from Cape Town (where it now inhabits suburban gardens) eastwards as far as the Eastern Cape.

A. porphyreus are not aggressive or territorial, and several of them will often live together in a single retreat. These sociable lizards will even share nests, where several females will lay their eggs.

References

Geckos of Africa
Reptiles of Namibia
Reptiles of South Africa
Taxa named by François Marie Daudin
Gekkonidae
Reptiles described in 1802